Abrazo Arizona Heart Hospital is a privately owned hospital in Phoenix, Arizona, United States.

History 
It was founded in 1981, and in 2010, it was purchased by Abrazo Community Health Network, a subsidiary of Vanguard Health Systems. The hospital was accredited by The Society of Chest Pain Centers and was mentioned in the 2008 Reuters 100 Top Hospitals for Cardiovascular Care In 2013, Vanguard was acquired by Tenet Healthcare.

References

Tenet Healthcare
Hospitals established in 1998
Companies based in Phoenix, Arizona
Hospitals in Arizona
Buildings and structures in Phoenix, Arizona